The Model from Montparnasse or Adieu Mascotte is a 1929 German comedy film directed by Wilhelm Thiele and starring Lilian Harvey, Igo Sym and Marietta Millner. Originally made as a silent film, it later had synchronized sound added. It is set in the Demimonde of Paris with a heroine working as an artist's model.

The film's sets were designed by the art directors Heinz Fenchel and Jacek Rotmil. It was shot at the Babelsberg, Staaken and Tempelhof Studios in Berlin. Location shooting took place in Paris and Nice.

Cast
 Lilian Harvey as Mascotte
 Igo Sym as Jean Dardier, author
 Marietta Millner as Josette, his wife
 Harry Halm as Gaston, her lover
 Julius Falkenstein as Giron
 Ernst Pröckl as Servant at the Gastons
 Erika Dannhoff as A model
 Oskar Sima as Servant at the Dardiers
 Hubert von Meyerinck as Sleeper conductor
 Albert Paulig
 Eugen Thiele

References

Bibliography
Prawer, S.S. Between Two Worlds: The Jewish Presence in German and Austrian Film, 1910–1933. Berghahn Books, 2005.

External links

1929 films
Films of the Weimar Republic
German silent feature films
Films directed by Wilhelm Thiele
UFA GmbH films
Films set in Paris
Transitional sound films
German black-and-white films
Films with screenplays by Franz Schulz
German comedy films
1929 comedy films
Films shot at Babelsberg Studios
Films shot at Staaken Studios
Films shot at Tempelhof Studios
Films shot in Paris
Films shot in Nice
Silent comedy films
1920s German films